ENTH domain-containing protein 1, also known as Epsin-2B and ENTHD1, is a protein that in humans is encoded by the ENTHD1 gene.

Gene
The ENTHD1 gene is located on human chromosome 22.

Expression
ENTHD1 proteins are expressed in 26 human organs, with the highest expression in the testes.

References